Pendleton is a town in Fall Creek Township, Madison County, Indiana, United States. The population was 4,253 at the 2010 census.

History
Pendleton was platted in 1830, and incorporated as a town in 1854. It was named for town founder Thomas Pendleton.

Frederick Douglass wrote of being attacked by a  mob as he promoted the Abolition cause in 1843.  His party had erected a platform in nearby woods.  A crowd of "rough characters", largely from "Andersonville", tried to silence them, then severely beat them.  He defended himself with a stick, but was knocked unconscious.  He was nursed back to health over days by the Quaker Neal Hardy and his wife. Douglass never regained full use of his injured hand.

2019 tornado 

Pendleton was struck by a strong tornado during the evening of May 27, 2019, during a major tornado outbreak. Moderate damage was reported to the town, with search and rescue efforts beginning that night. The tornado received a rating of high-end EF-2, with winds of 130 mph.

Geography
Pendleton is located at  (40.002841, -85.746576).

Demographics

Pendleton is part of the Anderson, Indiana Metropolitan Statistical Area.

2010 census
As of the 2010 United States Census, there were 4,253 people, 1,754 households, and 1,154 families in the town. The racial makeup of the town was 96.6% White, 1.0% African American, 0.3% Native American, 0.8% Asian, 0.1% Pacific Islander, 0.3% from other races, and 0.9% from two or more races. Hispanic or Latino of any race were 1.0% of the population.

There were 1,754 households, of which 34.9% had children under the age of 18 living with them, 47.4% were married couples living together, 13.7% had a female householder with no husband present, 4.7% had a male householder with no wife present, and 34.2% were non-families. 30.4% of all households were made up of individuals, and 12.8% had someone living alone who was 65 years of age or older. The average household size was 2.37 and the average family size was 2.94.

The median age in the town was 37.6 years. 26.4% of residents were under the age of 18; 6.7% were between the ages of 18 and 24; 27.4% were from 25 to 44; 24.5% were from 45 to 64; and 15% were 65 years of age or older. The gender makeup of the town was 47.3% male and 52.7% female.

2000 census
As of the 2000 United States Census, of 2000, there were 3,873 people, 1,550 households, and 1,052 families in the town. The racial makeup of the town was 98.27% White, 0.39% African American, 0.10% Native American, 0.46% Asian, 0.21% from other races, and 0.57% from two or more races. Hispanic or Latino of any race were 0.52% of the population.

There were 1,550 households, out of which 34.6% had children under the age of 18 living with them, 53.3% were married couples living together, 10.8% had a female householder with no husband present, and 32.1% were non-families. 27.9% of all households were made up of individuals, and 11.6% had someone living alone who was 65 years of age or older. The average household size was 2.41 and the average family size was 2.94.

The town population contained 25.7% under the age of 18, 7.2% from 18 to 24, 29.9% from 25 to 44, 21.3% from 45 to 64, and 15.9% who were 65 years of age or older. The median age was 36 years. For every 100 females, there were 88.1 males. For every 100 females age 18 and over, there were 84.0 males.

The median income for a household in the town was $46,204, and the median income for a family was $54,556. Males had a median income of $39,545 versus $25,753 for females. The per capita income for the town was $20,074. About 3.7% of families and 4.1% of the population were below the poverty line, including 5.7% of those under age 18 and none of those age 65 or over.

Arts and culture

Museums and other points of interest
The Pendleton Historic District, a U.S. Registered Historic District covers an area roughly bounded by Fall Creek, the Conrail right-of-way, Madison and Adams Sts. It is listed on the National Register of Historic Places along with Madison County Bridge No. 149.

Education
The town houses the schools for South Madison Community School Corporation. The district has three elementary schools: Pendleton Elementary (formerly South Elementary), East Elementary and Maple Ridge Elementary. Pendleton Heights High School sits atop a hill on the edge of the east side of town and serves as the local high school. A newly constructed Pendleton Heights Middle School opened in August 2009 across from the high school. The former middle school, located in the downtown area just north of Pendleton Elementary, now serves as Pendleton Elementary School - Intermediate.

The town has a lending library, the Pendleton Community Public Library.

Newspaper
The Times-Post is a weekly newspaper serving Pendleton and the surrounding communities. The paper was formerly known as The Pendleton Times, and was the first to feature Jim Davis' original comic strip "Gnorm Gnat" and "Jon", a prototype of Garfield.

Radio
WEEM (91.7 FM) is a radio station located on the campus of Pendleton Heights High School and run by the students. The format of the station is contemporary rock. WEEM has been operational since 1970. WEEM competes in the annual IASB State Radio Contest.

Transportation
Highways
 Major highways and roads that serve Pendleton include I-69, State Road 9, State Road 38, State Road 67, and U.S. Route 36

Ambulance service
According to the Indiana EMS commission, Pendleton Emergency Ambulance operates one of only two volunteer Advanced Life Support (ALS) ambulance services in Indiana.

Prisons
Three facilities of the Indiana Department of Corrections are in Fall Creek Township, near Pendleton
 Pendleton Correctional Facility
 Correctional Industrial Facility
 Pendleton Juvenile Correctional Facility

The Pendleton Correctional Facility is located on the south edge of town. Famous former inmates include: John Dillinger, Harry Pierpont, Jim "Goose" Ligon and Homer Van Meter. The Pendleton Reformatory is a maximum security prison and is located at 4490 Reformatory Rd.

Historical events

Fall Creek Massacre
The Fall Creek Massacre is the name given to the brutal murders of a peaceful group of Seneca and Miami Indians by white settlers. The massacre occurred on March 22, 1824 in Madison County, Indiana between Fall Creek and Deer Lick Creek. James Hudson's trial was held October 7–9, 1824. Trials of the other men were held in 1825. The trial set an important precedent in recognizing the civil rights of Native Americans. The three men were hanged for their crimes at Falls Park in Pendleton. This marked the first time white men were executed for the murder of Native Americans in the United States. A historical marker in Falls Park marks the place of the hanging. The inscription reads: "Three white men were hung here in 1825 for killing Indians."

Frederick Douglass
Abolitionist Frederick Douglass was attacked by a mob in 1843 while attempting to deliver a lecture in Pendleton. He was knocked unconscious and his hand was broken. Douglass described the attack as follows: "Pendleton this mobocratic spirit was even more pronounced. It was found impossible to obtain a building in which to hold our convention, and our friends, Dr. Fussell and others, erected a platform in the woods, where quite a large audience assembled. Mr. Bradburn, Mr. White, and myself were in attendance. As soon as we began to speak a mob of about sixty of the roughest characters I ever looked upon ordered us, through its leaders, to "be silent," threatening us, if we were not, with violence. We attempted to dissuade them, but they had not come to parley but to fight, and were well armed. They tore down the platform on which we stood, assaulted Mr. White and knocking out several of his teeth, dealt a heavy blow on William A. White, striking him on the back part of the head, badly cutting his scalp and felling him to the ground. Undertaking to fight my way through the crowd with a stick which I caught up in the mêlée, I attracted the fury of the mob, which laid me prostrate on the ground under a torrent of blows. Leaving me thus, with my right hand broken, and in a state of unconsciousness, the mobocrats hastily mounted their horses and rode to Andersonville, where most of them resided. I was soon raised up and revived by Neal Hardy, a kind-hearted member of the Society of Friends, and carried by him in his wagon about three miles (5 km) in the country to his home, where I was tenderly nursed and bandaged by good Mrs. Hardy till I was again on my feet, but as the bones broken were not properly set my hand has never recovered its natural strength and dexterity. We lingered long in Indiana, and the good effects of our labors there are felt at this day. I have lately visited Pendleton, now one of the best republican towns in the State, and looked again upon the spot where I was beaten down, and have again taken by the hand some of the witnesses of that scene, amongst whom was the kind, good lady—Mrs. Hardy—who, so like the good Samaritan of old, bound up my wounds, and cared for me so kindly."

Notable people
 George Daugherty (Conductor and Producer/Director)(1955-) A graduate of Pendleton Heights High School.  Five-time Emmy Award nominated director, producer, and music director, and primetime Emmy Award winner as producer of "Peter and The Wolf" for ABC television network; symphony orchestra conductor who has guest conducted over 250 major international orchestras, including The New York Philharmonic, Boston Pops, Los Angeles Philharmonic at The Hollywood Bowl, Philadelphia Orchestra, Cleveland Orchestra, Sydney Symphony at the Sydney Opera House and many others, and creator of the touring symphony orchestra concert franchises "Bugs Bunny On Broadway," and "Bugs Bunny at the Symphony. Winner of numerous awards, including The Indiana Governor's Arts Award (1999).
 William Walker (1896-1992) Was an actor in motion pictures and television. Most remembered for the role of Reverend Sykes in To Kill a Mockingbird in 1962. He was an African American and a 1914 graduate of Pendleton High School.
 Fred Wilt (1920-1994) A 1939 graduate of Pendleton High School, who set the world record in the two mile at 8:51 in 1952. He was a two-time US Olympian in 1948 and 1952 in the 10,000 meters. He was named the winner of the 1950 James E. Sullivan Award as the best amateur athlete in the US.
 Dick Dickey (1926-2006) A 1944 graduate of Pendleton High School. Played basketball at North Carolina State and was drafted in the 3rd round of the NBA draft of 1950. He played guard for the Boston Celtics in the NBA in 1951-52 averaging 2.8 ppg.
 Don Hankins (1902-1963) He was a major league baseball pitcher for the 1927 Detroit Tigers.
 Joseph Swain (1857-1927) The Pendleton native was the first Indiana-born president of Indiana University, serving from 1893 to 1902. He left Indiana and was president of Swarthmore College from 1902 until his retirement in 1921.
 Kellen Dunham (1993–present) Pendleton native professional basketball player. Played as a shooting guard at Butler University from 2012-2016, then professionally for  Okapi Aalstar of the Basketball League Belgium.
 Walter Dorwin Teague (December 18, 1883 – December 5, 1960) was an American industrial designer, architect, illustrator, graphic designer, writer, and entrepreneur. Often referred to as the "Dean of Industrial Design"

References

External links

 Town website
 South Madison Community School Corporation website
 City-Data.com

 
Towns in Indiana
Towns in Madison County, Indiana